Archibald Russell was an aeronautical engineer who served as chief designer for the Bristol Aeroplane Company.

Archibald Russell may also refer to:

 Archibald George Blomefield Russell (1879–1955), British historian and King of Arms
 Archibald D. Russell (1853–1919), American financier and philanthropist
 Archibald Russell (ship), a 1905 tall ship built by Scotts Shipbuilding and Engineering Company

Russell, Archibald